The Potters Savings and Loan Company (originally known as Potters Building and Savings Co.) was a savings and loan association in East Liverpool, Ohio. The association was organized by John Purinton and incorporated on February 11, 1889.

The Potters Building and Savings Company purchased land on Washington Street in East Liverpool in 1903. The savings and loan building was built in 1904. The architects for the project were Owsley & Boucherle of Youngstown, Ohio. The building was added to the National Register of Historic Places on November 14, 1985.

References

External links

National Register of Historic Places in Columbiana County, Ohio
Buildings and structures completed in 1904
Buildings and structures in Columbiana County, Ohio